HOW (ISSN 0886-0483) was a bimonthly magazine for graphic designers. Launched in 1985, HOW was edited by Megan Lane Patrick. HOW was published by F+W Media of Cincinnati, Ohio. F+W Media filed for Chapter 11 on March 10, 2019. HOW Design, Print and their affiliated web sites are no longer in business.

The magazine had regular sections on business, creativity, design, and technology to help designers. 

HOW published six issues a year and hosted six creative competitions in graphic design, logo design, promotion and marketing, interactive media and inhouse design.

HOW also offered an online education program, launched in December 2011 called HOW Design University (HOW U). HOW U provided online learning opportunities for creative professionals in a variety of formats including online design courses, online design bootcamps and live tutorials (webinars). HOW U was professional-level continuing education that helped designers get the tools to prepare them for the most popular graphic design jobs.

References

External links
 How Design, official website
 HOW Design Competitions, official competition website
 HOW Design University, official HOW U website

1985 establishments in Ohio
2019 disestablishments in Ohio
Visual arts magazines published in the United States
Biweekly magazines published in the United States
Defunct magazines published in the United States
Design magazines
Magazines established in 1985
Magazines disestablished in 2019
Magazines published in Cincinnati